Kokshaga may refer to:

 Bolshaya Kokshaga River
 Malaya Kokshaga River